Douglas Blair (26 June 1921 – July 1998) was an English professional footballer. He began his career at Blackpool but never featured in a Football League match for the club following the outbreak of the Second World War. On his return to football in 1947, he joined Cardiff City and went on to make over 200 appearances for the club.

Personal life
Born in Ecclesfield, Sheffield, Blair was the son of Scottish international Jimmy Blair Sr. and brother of Jimmy Blair Jr.

Career
Blair started out at Blackpool, signing for the club in May 1939. However the outbreak of the Second World War soon after meant he never featured for the club in the Football League. He played in wartime fixtures for the club during the 1939–40 season but was conscripted and left the club. While undergoing his army training, Blair featured in eight wartime fixtures for Aldershot, scoring four times. He later played in one fixture for Leeds United on 25 August 1945 against Chesterfield.

Following the return of league football, Blair joined Cardiff City, where his father Jimmy had played during the 1920s, in August 1947. He became a vital part of the Bluebirds side in the following years and helped them to win promotion to the First Division during the 1951–52 season. Blair scored thirty goals during his career at Cardiff, all scored in league competition. He left Ninian Park in 1954 to sign for Hereford United where he finished his career. He made 113 appearances for Hereford and scored 31 goals for the Edgar Street club.

References

1921 births
People from Ecclesfield
English footballers
Blackpool F.C. players
Leeds United F.C. wartime guest players
Cardiff City F.C. players
Hereford United F.C. players
English Football League players
Footballers from Sheffield
1998 deaths
Association football inside forwards
English people of Scottish descent
Footballers from Cardiff